Francesco Nappi (1584 – November 1628) was a Roman Catholic prelate who served as Bishop of Polignano (1619–1628).

Biography
Francesco Nappi was born in 1584.
On 20 November 1619, he was appointed Bishop of Polignano by Pope Paul V.
On 8 December 1619, he was consecrated bishop by Giulio Savelli, Bishop of Ancona e Numana, with Marinus Bizzius, Archbishop of Bar, and Giulio Sansedoni, Bishop Emeritus of Grosseto, serving as co-consecrators. 
He served as Bishop of Polignano until his death in November 1628.

Episcopal succession
While bishop, he was the principal co-consecrator of:

References 

17th-century Italian Roman Catholic archbishops
Bishops appointed by Pope Paul V
1584 births
1628 deaths